The following lists events that happened during 1852 in Chile.

Incumbents
President of Chile: Manuel Montt

Events

Births
17 February - Agustín Edwards Ross (died 1897)
21 October - José Toribio Medina (died 1930)

Deaths
13 May - Francisco de la Lastra (born 1777)

References 

 
1850s in Chile
Chile
Chile